Paraguay competed at the 2020 Summer Olympics in Tokyo. Originally scheduled to take place from 24 July to 9 August 2020, the Games have been postponed to 23 July to 8 August 2021, because of the COVID-19 pandemic. It was the nation's thirteenth appearance at the Summer Olympics, with the exception of the 1980 Summer Olympics in Moscow because of the nation's partial support for the US-led boycott.

Competitors
The following is the list of number of competitors participating in the Games:

Athletics

Paraguayan athletes achieved the entry standards, either by qualifying time or by world ranking, in the following track and field events (up to a maximum of 3 athletes in each event):

Track & road events

Cycling

Road
Paraguay entered one rider each to compete in the women's Olympic road race for the first time in history, by securing an outright berth, as the highest-ranked cyclist, not yet qualified, at the 2019 Pan American Championships in Mexico.

Golf

Paraguay entered one golfer into the Olympic tournament. Rio 2016 Olympian Fabrizio Zanotti (world no. 280) qualified directly among the top 60 eligible players for the men's event based on the IGF World Rankings of 20 June 2021.

Rowing

Paraguay qualified one boat in the women's single sculls for the Games by winning the silver medal and securing the second of five berths available at the 2021 FISA Americas Olympic Qualification Regatta in Rio de Janeiro, Brazil, signifying the country's return to the sport for the first time since 2012.

Qualification Legend: FA=Final A (medal); FB=Final B (non-medal); FC=Final C (non-medal); FD=Final D (non-medal); FE=Final E (non-medal); FF=Final F (non-medal); SA/B=Semifinals A/B; SC/D=Semifinals C/D; SE/F=Semifinals E/F; QF=Quarterfinals; R=Repechage

Swimming

Paraguay received a universality invitation from FINA to send two top-ranked swimmers (one per gender) in their respective individual events to the Olympics, based on the FINA Points System of June 28, 2021.

Tennis

Paraguay entered one tennis player into the Olympic tournament. Verónica Cepede Royg secured the outright berth in the women's singles by winning the bronze medal at the 2019 Pan American Games in Lima, Peru, replacing the slot from the U.S. tennis player Caroline Dolehide.

See also
Paraguay at the 2019 Pan American Games
Paraguay at the 2020 Summer Paralympics

References

Nations at the 2020 Summer Olympics
2020
2021 in Paraguayan sport